Awang Bay is a bay in southeast Lombok, Indonesia, about 800 metres from the village of Ekas. It is a reputable surfing location. Cliffs overlook the bay from both sides.

References

Bays of Indonesia
Landforms of Lombok
Surfing locations in Indonesia
Landforms of West Nusa Tenggara